Andrea Silipo (born 17 April 2001) is an Italian professional footballer who plays as a forward for  club Juve Stabia, on loan from Palermo.

Club career 
A Roma youth product, he was signed on loan by then-Serie D club Palermo on 30 December 2019, effective from the January 2020 transfer window.

Silipo consistently played in the second half of the 2019–20 Serie D season that was cut short due to the COVID-19 pandemic in Italy, with his performances leading Palermo to sign him permanently following the club's promotion to Serie C; he signed a four-year deal, with an option for Roma to buy him back within two years.

On 26 August 2022, after two Serie C campaigns which saw him mostly used as a backup, Silipo was loaned out to Serie C club Juve Stabia.

Career statistics

Club

References

2001 births
Living people
Italian footballers
Footballers from Rome
Association football forwards
Palermo F.C. players
S.S. Juve Stabia players
Serie D players
Serie C players